The Claremore Auto Dealership, at 625 W. Will Rogers Blvd. in Claremore, Oklahoma, was a historic Art Deco-style building built in 1930.  It was listed on the National Register of Historic Places in 1995.

The historic building appears to have been demolished, because the outward appearance of the building on the site, as photographed in 2010, is completely different.

It has also been known as Claremore Tire Company.

References

Auto dealerships on the National Register of Historic Places
National Register of Historic Places in Rogers County, Oklahoma
Art Deco architecture in Oklahoma
Buildings and structures completed in 1930